The 1960 Craven A International was a motor race staged at the Mount Panorama Circuit, Bathurst, New South Wales, Australia on 2 October 1960.
It was the second 100-mile race for Formula Libre cars to be held at Bathurst in 1960, but unlike the Bathurst 100 held in April, the Craven A International was not a "Gold Star" race counting towards the 1960 Australian Drivers' Championship.

The race was won by Jack Brabham driving a Cooper T51 Coventry Climax.

Race results

Notes
 Pole Position: Jack Brabham, 2m 33.7s
 Starters: 26
 Finishers: 9
 Winner's race time: 1h 7m 37.5s
 Fastest Lap: Jack Brabham, 2m 30.4s (new record)

References

Craven A International
Motorsport in Bathurst, New South Wales